The Order of Excellence is an honour that can be given by the government of the Bahamas. It was founded in 2016.

References

Orders, decorations, and medals of the Bahamas
Awards established in 2016
2016 establishments in the Bahamas